The Yuna broad-blazed slider (Lerista yuna) is a species of skink found in Western Australia.

References

Lerista
Reptiles described in 1991
Taxa named by Glen Milton Storr